Banara ibaguensis is a species of plant in the family Salicaceae. It is endemic to Colombia.

References

ibaguensis
Endemic flora of Colombia
Taxonomy articles created by Polbot
Taxa named by Edmond Tulasne